Most Libyans adhere to the Sunni branch of Islam, which provides both a spiritual guide for individuals and a keystone for government policy. Its tenets stress a unity of religion and state rather than a separation or distinction between the two, and even those Muslims who have ceased to believe fully in Islam retain Islamic habits and attitudes. The post-revolution National Transitional Council has explicitly endeavored to reaffirm Islamic values, enhance appreciation of Islamic culture, elevate the status of Qur'anic law and, to a considerable degree, emphasize Qur'anic practice in everyday Libyan life with legal implementation in accordance to Islamic jurisprudence known as sharia. Libya has a very small presence of Ahmadis and Shias consisting of Pakistani immigrants, though unrecognized by the state .

History
During the seventh century, Muslims, who were spreading their faith,  reached Libya to spread the message. The urban centers soon became substantially Islamic, but widespread conversion of the nomads of the desert did not come until after large-scale invasions in the eleventh century by Bedouin tribes from Arabia and Egypt.

A residue of pre-Islamic beliefs blended with the Islam of the Arabs. Hence, popular Islam became an overlay of Quranic ritual and principles upon the vestiges of earlier beliefs—prevalent throughout North Africa—in jinns (spirits), the evil eye, rites to ensure good fortune, and cult veneration of local saints. The educated of the cities and towns served as the primary bearers and guardians of the more austere brand of orthodox Islam.

Islam in Gaddafi's Libya

Under the revolutionary Gaddafi government, the role of orthodox Islam in Libyan life became progressively more important. Muammar al-Gaddafi was a highly devout Muslim, with an expressed desire to exalt Islam and to restore it to its proper—i.e., central—place in the life of the people. He believed that the purity of Islam had been sullied through time, particularly by the influence of Europeans, both during and after the colonial period, and that Islam's purity must be restored by such actions as: the restoration of sharia to its proper place as the basis of the Libyan legal system, the banning of "immodest" practices and dress, and the symbolic purification of mosques.

Gaddafi also believed in the value of the Quran as a moral and political guide for the contemporary world, as is evident from his tract, The Green Book, published in the mid-1970s (see The Green Book, ch. 4). Gaddafi considered the first part of The Green Book to be a commentary on the implications of the Quranic injunction that human affairs be managed by consultation. For him, this meant direct democracy, which is given "practical meaning" through the creation of people's committees and popular congresses. Gaddafi felt that, inasmuch as The Green Book was based solely on the Quran, its provisions should be universally applicable—at least among Muslims.

Soon after taking office, the Gaddafi government showed itself to be devoutly conservative by closing bars and nightclubs, banning entertainment deemed provocative or immodest, and making use of the Muslim calendar mandatory. The intention of reestablishing sharia was announced, and Gaddafi personally assumed chairmanship of a commission to study the problems involved. In November 1973, a new legal code was issued that revised the entire Libyan judicial system to conform to the sharia, and in 1977 the General People's Congress (GPC—see Glossary) issued a statement that all future legal codes would be based on the Quran.

Among the laws enacted by the Gaddafi government were a series of legal penalties prescribed during 1973 which included the punishment of armed robbery by amputation of a hand and a foot. The legislation contained qualifying clauses making its execution unlikely, but its enactment had the effect of applying Quranic principles in the modern era. Another act prescribed flogging for individuals breaking the fast of Ramadan, and yet another called for eighty lashes to be administered to both men and women guilty of fornication.

In the early 1970s, Islam played a major role in legitimizing Gaddafi's political and social reforms. By the end of the decade, however, he had begun to attack the religious establishment and several fundamental aspects of Sunni Islam. Gaddafi asserted the transcendence of the Quran as the sole guide to Islamic governance and the unimpeded ability of every Muslim to read and interpret it. He denigrated the roles of the ulama, imams, and Islamic jurists and questioned the authenticity of the hadith, and thereby the sunna, as a basis for Islamic law. The sharia itself, Gaddafi maintained, governed only such matters as properly fell within the sphere of religion; all other matters lay outside the purview of religious law. Finally, he called for a revision of the Muslim calendar, saying it should date from Muhammad's death in 632, an event he felt was more momentous than the hijra ten years earlier.

These unorthodox views on the hadith, sharia, and the Islamic era aroused a good deal of unease. They seemed to originate from Gaddafi's conviction that he possessed the transcendent ability to interpret the Quran and to adapt its message to modern life. Equally, they reinforced the view that he was a reformer but not a literalist in matters of the Quran and Islamic tradition. On a practical level, however, several observers agreed that Gaddafi was less motivated by religious convictions than by political calculations. By espousing these views and by criticizing the ulama, he was using religion to undermine a segment of the middle class that was notably vocal in opposing his economic policies in the late 1970s. But Gaddafi clearly considered himself an authority on the Quran and Islam and was not afraid to challenge traditional religious authority. He also was not prepared to tolerate dissent.

The revolutionary government gave repeated evidence of its desire to establish Libya as a leader of the Islamic world. Moreover, Gaddafi's efforts to create an Arab nation through political union with other Arab states were also based on a desire to create a great Islamic nation. Indeed, Gaddafi drew little distinction between the two.

The government took a leading role in supporting Islamic institutions and in worldwide proselytizing on behalf of Islam. The Jihad Fund, supported by a payroll tax, was established in 1970 to aid the Palestinians in their struggle with Israel. The Faculty of Islamic Studies and Arabic at the University of Benghazi was charged with training Muslim intellectual leaders for the entire Islamic world, and the Islamic Mission Society used public funds for the construction and repair of mosques and Islamic educational centers in cities as widely separated as Vienna and Bangkok. The Islamic Call Society (Ad Dawah) was organized with government support to propagate Islam abroad, particularly throughout Africa, and to provide funds to Muslims everywhere. The symbolic purification major urban mosques took place in 1978.

Gaddafi was forthright in his belief in the perfection of Islam and his desire to propagate it. His commitment to the open propagation of Islam, among other reasons, caused him to oppose the Muslim Brotherhood, an Egyptian-based fundamentalist movement that used clandestine and sometimes subversive means to spread Islam and to eliminate Western influences. Although the Brotherhood's activities in Libya were banned in the mid-1980s, it remained present in the country maintaining a low profile. In 1983 a member of the brotherhood was executed in Tripoli, and in 1986 a group of Brotherhood adherents was arrested after the murder of a high-ranking political official in Benghazi. The Muslim Brotherhood had  spread throughout Libya, but were particularly strong in the cities of Benghazi, Bayda, Derna and Ajdabiya. Gaddafi challenged the Brotherhood to establish itself openly in non-Muslim countries and promised its leaders that, if it did, he would financially support its activities. No support was ever forthcoming.

Gaddafi stressed the universal applicability of Islam, but he also reaffirmed the special status assigned by Muhammad to Christians. He likened Christians to misguided Muslims who strayed from the correct path. Furthermore, Gaddafi assumed leadership of a drive to rid Africa of Christianity as well as of the colonialism with which he associated it, despite the fact that Christianity's presence in Libya long predates Islam or its presence in much of Europe.

Saints and brotherhoods

Islam as practiced in North Africa is interlaced with indigenous Berber beliefs. Although the Sufi orthodoxy preached the unique and inimitable majesty and sanctity of God and the equality of God's believers, an important element of Islam for centuries has been a belief in the coalescence of special spiritual power given by god to particular living human beings. The power is known as Barakah, a transferable quality of personal blessedness and spiritual force said to lodge in certain individuals. Those whose claim to possess barakah can be substantiated—through performance of apparent miracles, exemplary human insight, or genealogical connection with a recognized possessor—are viewed as saints. These persons are known in the West as marabouts, a French transliteration of al murabitun (those who have made a religious retreat), and the benefits of their baraka are believed to accrue to those ordinary people who come in contact with them.

The true Islamic way of saints became widespread in rural areas; in urban localities, Islam in its Sunni form  prevail. Saints were present in Tripolitania, but they were particularly numerous in Cyrenaica. Their baraka continued to reside in their tombs after their deaths. The number of venerated tombs varied from tribe to tribe, although there tended to be fewer among the camel herders of the desert than among the sedentary and nomadic tribes of the plateau area. In one village, a visitor in the late 1960s counted sixteen still-venerated tombs.

Coteries of disciples frequently clustered around particular saints, especially those who preached an original tariqa (devotional "way"). Brotherhoods of the followers of such mystical teachers appeared in North Africa at least as early as the eleventh century and in some cases became mass movements. The founder ruled an order of followers, who were organized under the frequently absolute authority of a leader, or shaykh. The brotherhood was centered on a zawiya (pl., zawaya).

Because of Islam's austere rational and intellectual qualities, many people have felt drawn toward the more emotional and personal ways of knowing God practiced by mystical Islam, or Sufism. Found in many parts of the Muslim world, Sufism endeavored to produce a personal experience of the divine through mystic and ascetic discipline.

Sufi adherents gathered into brotherhoods, and Sufi orders became extremely popular, particularly in rural areas. Sufi brotherhoods exercised great influence and ultimately played an important part in the religious revival that swept through North Africa during the eighteenth and nineteenth centuries. In Libya, when the Ottoman Empire proved unable to mount effective resistance to the encroachment of Christian missionaries, the work was taken over by Sufi-inspired revivalist movements. Among these, the most forceful and effective was that of the Senussi, which extended into numerous parts of North Africa.

Senussi
The Senussi movement was a religious revival adapted to desert life. Its zawaayaa could be found in Tripolitania and Fezzan, but Senussi influence was strongest in Cyrenaica. The Senussi's first theocracy was in the city of Bayda, located in Cyrenaica, and that was the center for them in 1841.  After the Italian occupation, the focus turned from government to seminary education and then to the creation of an Islamic University which became in 1960 the University of Mohammed bin Ali al-Sanusi. The arrival of Muammar Gaddafi's rule changed the course of the university. It is now known as the Omar Al-Mukhtar University. Rescuing the region from unrest and anarchy, the Senussi movement gave the Cyrenaican tribal people a religious attachment and feelings of unity and purpose.

The Senussis formed a nucleus of resistance to the Italian colonial regime (see Italian Colonialism, ch. 1). As the nationalism fostered by unified resistance to the Italians gained adherents, however, the religious fervor of devotion to the movement began to wane, particularly after the Italians destroyed Senussi religious and educational centers during the 1930s. Nonetheless, King Idris, the monarch of independent Libya, was the grandson of the founder of the Senussi movement, and his status as a Senussi gave him the unique ability to command respect from the disparate parts of his kingdom.

Despite its momentary political prominence, the Senussi movement never regained its strength as a religious force after its zawaayaa were destroyed by the Italians. A promised restoration never fully took place, and the Idris regime used the Senussi heritage as a means of legitimizing political authority, rather than of providing religious leadership.

After unseating Idris in 1969, the revolutionary government placed restrictions on the operation of the remaining zawaayaa, appointed a supervisor for Senussi properties, and merged the Senussi-sponsored Islamic University with the University of Libya. The movement was virtually banned, but in the 1980s occasional evidence of Senussi activity was nonetheless reported. Senussi inspired activists were instrumental in freeing Cyrenaica from Gaddafi's control during the Libyan Civil War.

See also
 Islam by country
 Religion in Libya

References

External links
 Libyan Quran Reciter  with live Quran for streaming.